The Francorail-MTE CSE26-21 is a class of diesel-electric locomotives built in France by the GIE Francorail-MTE consortium between 1981 and 1985. The bogies were made by Creusot-Loire, electric equipment and traction motors by Société MTE, while the bodies were made by Carel et Fouché. They were fitted with American-made ALCO 16-251F engines of 3600 hp (2650 kW), and final assembly was performed by Carel-Fouché.

The launch customer was the Korean State Railway of North Korea, which bought seven units in 1981, and a further five in 1985. Subsequently, the Kim Chong-t'ae Electric Locomotive Works developed electric locomotives (the Ch'ŏngnyŏnjŏl Kinyom and the Red Flag 5400 classes) on the basis of the French-made units. The bulk of production,  was for the Iraqi Republic Railways, who received 72 units numbered in the series DEM 4001 - 4011 and DEM 4101 - 4161 from 1982. The Saudi Railways Organization received six locomotives of the type in 1983, numbered 3603 through 3608.

References

Locomotives of North Korea
Co-Co locomotives